Pirne is a village in Aytos Municipality, in Burgas Province, in southeastern Bulgaria.

Pirne Peak in Antarctica is named after the village.

References

Villages in Burgas Province